Khao may refer to:
 Khao, Iran, a village in Kurdistan Province, Iran
 Khao (pronounced ), the term for 'mountain' in Central and Southern Thailand; see List of mountains in Thailand
 Khao (pronounced ), the term for 'rice' in the Thai and Lao languages; see Rice production in Thailand and Rice production in Laos
 Khao soi, Chiang Mai Curry Noodles
 Khao language, a Mon-Khmer language spoken in Vietnam
 The ICAO airport identifier for Butler County Regional Airport